Pudhu Vasantham is a 1990 Indian Tamil-language musical drama film, written and directed by Vikraman. The film stars Murali, Anand Babu, Raja, Charle and Sithara. It revolves around a woman who, due to circumstances, ends up cohabitating with four men.

Pudhu Vasantham is the directorial debut of Vikraman. The film was produced by R. B. Choudary and R. Mohan under Super Good Films. It was released on 14 April 1990, and became major commercial success, running for over 25 weeks in theatres. The film was remade in Kannada as Shruthi the same year, and in Hindi as Baharon Ke Manzil a year later.

Plot 
Friends Balu, Michael, Raja and Manohar are street musicians who aim to achieve big in life despite leading a below poverty life. Balu sings, Michael dances and plays the tabla, Raja plays the guitar while Manohar plays the flute. One day, the friends come across Gowri, a seemingly mute girl. They help Gowri to find an address which she is looking for, however, the person Gowri intended to meet has left to London and will return only after a year. The four pity Gowri as she is helpless and allows her to stay with them.

Friendship blossoms for Gowri with four men and she does the household activities while the men seek opportunities to prove their talents. One day, they see Gowri negotiating with a vegetable vendor and the four get furious knowing Gowri has cheated them by acting as a mute girl. Gowri apologises to them and tells them her past.

Gowri is a rich girl born and brought up in Ooty. She is the only daughter of a rich estate owner, however her parents died when she was young following which Vishwam was appointed as her caretaker. Vishwam is greedy and plans to abduct Gowri's wealth. Gowri is in love with her schoolmate Suresh who hails from Madras.

Suresh has plans to leave to London for higher education. Meanwhile, Vishwam comes with a plan of marrying Gowri, so that he can inherit all her wealth. Gowri retaliates and runs away from Ooty to Madras with the hope of meeting Suresh. However, Suresh has already left for London before she could find his house.

Gowri says that the four men are so genuine and she liked their friendship which made her feel safe. Just to get their sympathy, she pretended to be mute. The four men are convinced and allow her to stay with them until Suresh returns. Gowri, with the help of her old business acquittance, gets an opportunity for the four men to perform at a music competition.

Meanwhile, Suresh returns from London and unites with Gowri. Now Gowri leaves to Suresh's home. Suresh does not like Gowri befriending these four poor men. Also, Suresh takes Gowri to a doctor to check her virginity which shatters Gowri. The four men visit Suresh's home requesting Gowri and Suresh to attend the competition, but Suresh turns down and insults them. The four men feel devastated and leave.

At the competition, the four men, to their surprise, find Gowri seated among audience during the competition. Post their performance, they enquire about Suresh, for which Gowri responds that she has broken up with Suresh as he has no trust on her. The four men win the competition and a chance to compose for a film. Gowri joins their troupe as a singer.

Cast 
Murali as Balu
Anand Babu as Michael
Raja as Raja
Charle as Manohar
Sithara as Gowri
Suresh as Suresh
Vinu Chakravarthy as Balu's father
R. P. Viswam as Vishwam
K. S. Ravikumar as the security guard (uncredited)

Production 
Pudhu Vasantham is the directorial debut of Vikraman.

Soundtrack 
The soundtrack were composed by S. A. Rajkumar, with lyrics written by Vaali, Muthulingam and Rajkumar. The song "Paattu Onnu Paada" is set in Shivaranjani raga.

Release and reception 
Pudhu Vasantham was released on 14 April 1990, alongside another Murali starrer Silambu. On 28 April 1990, Ananda Vikatan wrote that the friendship between four aspiring musicians and Gowri had been shown in a grand manner without diluting its purity. The reviewer also praised Rajkumar's music, and said the film proved that with a strong script, audiences would be engaged well even if there is no artiste value. On 13 May 1990, P. S. S. of Kalki appreciated the film for portraying the younger generation in a new light. Despite the lack of stars and its director being a newcomer, the film was a major commercial success, running for over 25 weeks in theatres, and was reported by Kavitha Shetty of India Today to be the "biggest success" of 1990.

Accolades

References

Bibliography

External links 
 

1990 directorial debut films
1990 films
1990s musical drama films
1990s Tamil-language films
Films about composers
Films about musical groups
Films directed by Vikraman
Films scored by S. A. Rajkumar
Indian buddy films
Indian musical drama films
Super Good Films films
Tamil films remade in other languages